Chiyalikulevo (Seyälequl) is a rural locality (a village) in Chekmagushevsky District, Bashkortostan, Russia. The population was 27 as of 2010. There is 1 street.

References 

Rural localities in Chekmagushevsky District